Ivan Đoković (also transliterated Ivan Djoković; born 20 December 1982 in Čačak) is a Serbian former footballer who played as a defensive midfielder.

External links
 
 
 
 Ivan Đoković at Utakmica.rs 
  
  

1982 births
Living people
Sportspeople from Čačak
Serbian footballers
Association football midfielders
FK Borac Čačak players
FK Novi Pazar players
FK Polet Ljubić players
Serbian SuperLiga players
FC UTA Arad players
Liga I players
FC VSS Košice players
Serbian First League players
Slovak Super Liga players
Serbian expatriate footballers
Expatriate footballers in Romania
Expatriate footballers in Slovakia
Serbian expatriate sportspeople in Romania
Serbian expatriate sportspeople in Slovakia